Tregear may refer to:

People
 Chelsey Tregear (1983–), Australian netball player
 Edward Tregear (1846–1931), New Zealand public servant
 G.S. Tregear (1802–1841), English caricaturist
 Mary Tregear (1924–2010), British art historian

Places
 Mount Tregear, New Zealand
 Tregear, Cornwall, England
 Tregear, New South Wales, Australia